Viva Green is a Viva bus rapid transit line in York Region, north of Toronto, Ontario, Canada. It is operated by Tok Transit under contract from the Region of York.

Service on the Viva Green route was suspended during the COVID-19 outbreak, and has not resumed .

Route description
There are 12 stations on the line, between the southern terminal at Don Mills subway station in North York and McCowan Road in Markham. Viva Green operates during rush hour only and   connects Viva Purple and Pink with Line 4 Sheppard. The line also serves Unionville GO Station via Enterprise.

Future
York Region Transit plans to restructure Viva Green as a full service route on Leslie Street and Major Mackenzie Drive between the current southern terminus of Don Mills Station and the intersection of Major Mackenzie Drive and Harding Boulevard, about two kilometres west of the Richmond Hill GO Station. It is planned to have connections with Viva Silver west of Richmond Hill GO Station and Viva Blue at Yonge Street.

References

Green